Oceania is a region centered on the islands of the tropical Pacific Ocean. Conceptions of what constitutes Oceania vary, with it being defined in various ways, often geopolitically or geographically. In the geopolitical conception used by the United Nations, International Olympic Committee, and many atlases, the Oceanic region includes Australia and the nations of the Pacific from Papua New Guinea east, but not the Malay Archipelago or Indonesian New Guinea. The term is sometimes used more specifically to denote Australasia as a geographic continent, 
or biogeographically as a synonym for either the Australasian realm (Wallacea and Australasia) or the Oceanian realm (Melanesia, Polynesia, and Micronesia apart either from New Zealand or from mainland New Guinea).

Although Christmas Island and the Cocos (Keeling) Islands belong to the Commonwealth of Australia and are inhabited, they are nearer Indonesia than the Australian mainland, and are commonly associated with Asia instead of Oceania.

Demographics by territory 

The demographic table below shows all inhabited states and territories of Oceania. The information in this chart comes from the CIA World Factbook or the United States Department of State, unless noted otherwise or not available (NA); where sources differ, references are included.

See also 
 Europeans in Oceania
 Indigenous peoples of Oceania
 Y-DNA haplogroups in populations of Oceania

Notes

References 

 
Oceania
Oceania